This is the order of battle for the Operation Olive Branch, a joint Turkish Armed Forces/Syrian National Army attack on the People's Protection Units-held Afrin Canton.

Turkey and allied forces 

 Turkish Armed Forces
 Land Forces
Second Army
4th Corps (Turkey)
 1st Commando Brigade 
7th Corps (Turkey)
3rd Commando Brigade (Turkey)
  Special forces
  Air Force
  Gendarmerie General Command
 Gendarmerie Special Public Security Command
  Gendarmerie Special Operations (JÖH)
  Village guards

 Turkish Naval Forces
SAS EOD (Explosive Ordnance Disposal)
 SAT
General Directorate of Security
Police Special Operation Department (PÖH)
National Intelligence Organization (MİT)
 Grey Wolves 

 Olive Branch Operations Room (Turkish-backed Free Syrian Army)
Victory Bloc
Elite Army
Elite Battalion (Azadî Battalion)
 Sham Legion
Army of Grandchildren
Northern Brigade
First Legion
Samarkand Brigade
 Muntasir Billah Brigade
Sultan Mehmed the Conqueror Brigade
Conquest Brigade (also part of the Levant Front)

Second Legion
 Sultan Murad Division
Sultan Suleiman Shah Brigade
 Hamza Division
Kurdish Falcons Brigade
 Al-Mu'tasim Brigade
Third Legion
Levant Front
Northern Storm Brigade
 Ahrar al-Sham (also part of the Syrian Liberation Front)
Northern Army
Glory Corps

  Nour al-Din al-Zenki Movement (also part of the Syrian Liberation Front)
 Fastaqim Union
 Mare' Military Council
  Ahrar al-Sharqiya
 Ahl al-Diyar
  9th Special Forces Division
  Army of Victory
 Saladin Brigade (Descendants of Saladin Brigade remnant)
Martyr Mashaal Tammo Brigade
Qamishli Shield
Afrin Shield
Tajama a-Thuwar al-Kurd (coalition of Kurdish units in the TFSA)

23rd Division
Mustafa Brigade (ex-13th Division unit)
Northern Hawks Brigade
Vakkas Brigade
Mustafa Regiment
1st Commando Brigade
Conqueror Lions Brigade
Resolute Storm Brigade
Authenticity and Development Front
Sultan Othman Brigade
Men of War Brigade
5th Regiment
Second Army
Justice Union
Syrian Interim Government's Ministry of Defense
 Military Police
 Free Police
 Ex-Free East Ghouta Police forces

Southern front (non-TFSA units):
 Free Idlib Army
Mountain Hawks Brigade
 Syrian Liberation Front elements
 Army of Mujahideen remnants

Democratic Federation of Northern Syria and allied forces 
 
 Syrian Democratic Forces
 People's Protection Units (YPG)
 YPG International Battalion
American, British and German fighters
 Women's Protection Units (YPJ)
Martyr Avesta Xabur Battalion (Kongreya Star volunteers)
Anti-Terror Units (YAT)
 Army of Revolutionaries
 Kurdish Front
Revolutionary Shield Brigade
 Syriac Military Council (MFS)
 Northern Democratic Brigade
Idlib Military Council

 Afrin Region forces
Self-Defence Forces (HXP)
 Civil Defence Forces (HPC)
Asayish
 Kurdistan Workers' Party (PKK)
 People's Defence Forces (HPG)
 International Freedom Battalion and Peoples' United Revolutionary Movement
  MLKP
  TKP/ML TİKKO
  United Freedom Forces
  THKP-C/MLSPB
 DKP
 TKEP/L
  RUIS
  Martyr Michael Israel Brigade (Antifascist Forces in Afrin)
  Anarchist Struggle

 Sinjar Alliance
 Sinjar Resistance Units (YBŞ)
 Êzîdxan Women's Units (YJÊ)
 Anti-Turkish insurgents in Afrin District 
Afrin Falcons
Wrath of Olives operations room
Afrin Liberation Forces
 Pro-government forces ("Popular Forces")
 National Defence Forces
 Baqir Brigade
Militias from Nubl and al-Zahraa

References

Olive Branch, Operation